Ermita is a district in Manila, Philippines. Located at the central part of the city, the district is a significant center of finance, education, culture, and commerce. Ermita serves as the civic center of the city, bearing the seat of city government and a large portion of the area's employment, business, and entertainment activities.

Private and government offices, museums, and universities thrive in Ermita. It is also home to famous tourist attractions and landmarks, notably the Rizal Park, the premier national park of the Philippines.

Originally, Ermita and its neighboring district Malate were posh neighborhoods for Manila's high society during the early 20th century where large, grandiose mansions once stood. Ermita and its surroundings were heavily bombed and flattened during the Second World War after it became a battleground during the Manila Massacre. After the war, Ermita and its twin district, Malate, had undergone commercialization resulting in a shift from being a sprawling upscale suburb to a commercial district.

History

Hispanic era (1569–1898)

In pre-Hispanic times, it was originally known as Lagyo in Tagalog. This is reflected in the first record of the barangay in 1582:

"On the coast near Manila are Laguo, Malahat, Longalo, Palañac, Vakol, Minacaya, and Cavite. All these villages are in the neighborhood of Cavite, and belong to his Majesty, to whom they pay tribute."

Miguel de Loarca, Relacion de Yslas Filipinas (1582)

Lagyo was re-christened in the 17th century as La Hermita, the Spanish word for "hermitage", after the fact that a Mexican hermit resided in the area and on this site was built a hermitage housing an image of the Virgin Mary known as the Nuestra Señora de Guia (Our Lady of Guidance). The hermitage has since evolved into Ermita Church, which has been rebuilt several times since the early 17th century. During the Spanish evacuation of Ternate, Indonesia, the 200 families of mixed Mexican-Filipino-Spanish and Papuan-Indonesian-Portuguese descent who had ruled over the Christianized Sultanate of Ternate and included their Sultan who converted, were relocated to Ternate, Cavite and Ermita, Manila.

By 19th Century, although still considered as an "arrabal" which refers to a rural area, urban expansion had slowly reached the northern portion of the district mainly due to the development of the Luneta also called Bagumbayan as a promenade at the coast of Manila Bay. The district also saw the construction of the Manila Observatory by Father Federico Faura during the early 1890s, and was once located on a street now renamed after Fr. Faura himself. Ermita then developed a creole language based on Mexican-Spanish called Ermiteño, which eventually became extinct after the devastation of the Second World War, although it has a surviving cousin language in nearby Caviteño.

American and Commonwealth era (1900–1944)

Ermita gained renewed prominence during the American & Commonwealth Era. As part of Daniel Burnham's City Beautiful Movement during the early 1900s, Ermita district alongside Intramuros' surrounding areas had undergone a drastic redevelopment from being the outskirts to urban districts. In 1901, with the chartering of the city of Manila, Ermita would be absorbed by the city of Manila when its borders were extended outside the walled Intramuros.

Burnham envisioned the district especially in the northern portion to be the center of the Philippine Government, redeveloping Luneta into a grand park patterned after that of National Mall in Washington D.C. Government buildings such as the Legislative, Executive and Judicial branches were also planned to be located in the area. A proposed Philippine Capitol was also planned to be built at the eastern tip of Luneta Park but was never materialized.

It also became known as the university district, containing the campuses and dormitories of the Philippine Normal University, University of the Philippines, the Ateneo de Manila, Adamson University, the Assumption College and St. Paul College. The residential portion of Ermita was populated by American residents, who set up such establishments as the Army and Navy Club, and the University Club.

Aside from its universities, and leisure clubs; Ermita district, as well as its adjacent district, Malate which both happened to be facing Manila Bay were once home to Manila's high society and were filled with large, gilded mansions. Manila's wealthiest families used to live in the twin suburbs.

One notable structure also that was built was the Insular Ice Plant, which was designed by consulting architect, Edgar K. Bourne, who was also the head of the Bureau of Architecture in 1902 (under the Philippine Commission).

Second World War (1942–1945)
In February 1945, during the 1945 Battle of Manila, Ermita was the scene of some of the most horrific massacres that occurred during the Second World War. The wife and four children of future President Elpidio Quirino were murdered in Ermita, as was Supreme Court Associate Justice Anacleto Diaz. Between 68% to 85% of Ermita was destroyed during the Battle of Manila, with an estimated total of 100,000 Filipino civilians killed in the city itself.

Post-war era (1946–present)
After the war, the district slowly transformed from a residential area into a commercial area as the upper classes moved to other cities such as Quezon City and Makati.

Ermita was rebuilt after the devastation of the war. University life remained vibrant therein. However, as decades passed, Ermita started earning a reputation as the red-light district of Manila. During the first term of Mayor Alfredo Lim, 1992–1998, an effort was made to "clean up" Ermita's image and reputation. However, a local city ordinance prohibiting the establishment of motels, lodging houses and other similar establishments, was later declared unconstitutional by the Supreme Court. As a result of the clean-up efforts, nightlife in the area dwindled though it later picked up with the help of the emergence of the nearby Malate district and the Roxas Boulevard revitalization efforts along Manila Bay.

Accessibility
The district can be directly accessed by the main roads like the Roxas Boulevard, Padre Burgos Street, Taft Avenue and United Nations Avenue. The "Park N Ride" Lawton Bus Station, the city's main public transport hub, is located in the district along Padre Burgos Street.

The Manila Light Rail Transit System (LRT-1) follows Taft Avenue and stops at three stations located in Ermita, Central Terminal Station, United Nations Station and Pedro Gil Station.

Facilities

Recreation
Rizal Park, the widest open urban public park in the country and location of the monument to the national hero José Rizal, is a prominent feature of Ermita. This was the original site for Burnham's planned government center and capitol building. Other sites of interest in Ermita include:
National Museum of Fine Arts 
National Museum of Anthropology
National Museum of Natural History
National Library of the Philippines
National Archives of the Philippines
Museo Pambata
Insurance Commission
Quirino Grandstand
Manila Doctors Hospital
Manila Ocean Park
Liwasang Bonifacio
Arroceros Forest Park
Bonifacio Shrine
Mehan Garden
Metropolitan Theater
Manila Hotel
The Masonic Temple of Ermita
Philippine Independent Church
 San Vicente de Paul Church
Ermita Church
Philippine General Hospital, the country's largest hospital
Medical Center Manila

Education
A number of educational institutions are also found in Ermita, including:
University of the Philippines, Manila
Adamson University
Emilio Aguinaldo College
Santa Isabel College Manila
Philippine Normal University
Technological University of the Philippines
Universidad de Manila (formerly the City College of Manila)
Manila Science High School
 Araullo High School

Barangays

Ermita is made up of 13 Barangays numbered 659, 659-A, 660, 660-A, 661, 663, 663-A, 664, 666, 667, 668, 669, and 670.

Barangays 659, 659-A, 660, 660-A, 661, 663, 663-A, and 664 are part of Zone 71 of the City of Manila and barangays 666, 667, 668, 669, and 670 are part of Zone 72.

References

 
Districts of Manila